HMAS Childers (ACPB 93) is an Armidale-class patrol boat of the Royal Australian Navy (RAN). Named for the towns of Childers, Queensland and Childers, Victoria, Childers is the only ship in the RAN to be named after two towns.

Design and construction

The semi-displacement vee hull is fabricated from aluminium alloy, and each vessel is built to a combination of Det Norske Veritas standards for high-speed light craft and RAN requirements.

The main armament of the Armidale class is a Rafael Typhoon stabilised  gun mount fitted with an M242 Bushmaster autocannon. Two  machine guns are also carried. Boarding operations are performed by two , waterjet propelled rigid-hulled inflatable boats (RHIBs). Each RHIB is stored in a dedicated cradle and davit, and is capable of operating independently from the patrol boat as it carries its own communications, navigation, and safety equipment.

Each patrol boat has a standard ship's company of 21 personnel, with a maximum of 29. The Armidales do not have a permanently assigned ship's company; instead, they are assigned to divisions at a ratio of two vessels to three companies, which rotate through the vessels and allow the Armidales to spend more time at sea, without compromising sailors' rest time or training requirements. A 20-berth auxiliary accommodation compartment was included in the design for the transportation of soldiers, illegal fishermen, or unauthorised arrivals; in the latter two cases, the compartment could be secured from the outside. However, a malfunction in the sewerage treatment facilities aboard  in August 2006 pumped hydrogen sulfide and carbon monoxide into the compartment, non-fatally poisoning four sailors working inside, after which use of the compartment for accommodation was banned across the class.

Childers was constructed by Austal at their shipyard in Henderson, Western Australia. She was launched on 18 December 2006, and was commissioned in Cairns, Queensland on 7 July 2007.

Operational history
Assigned to Ardent Division, Childers is based in Cairns and performs border protection and fisheries protection patrols.

In January 2014, Childers visited Burma as part of Australian Government efforts to strengthen relations with the Government of Myanmar; the first RAN ship since  in 1959.

Citations

References
Books

 The chapter is available separately as Semaphore, Issue 4, 2006 in PDF and HTML formats.

Journal and news articles

Websites and other media
 Australian Department of Defence press release Navy's Eleventh Armidale Class Patrol Boat Commissions, 7 July 2007.

External links
Royal Australian Navy webpage for HMAS Childers

Ships built by Austal
Naval ships of Australia
Armidale-class patrol boats
2006 ships